The Jewish Bundist (socialist) labour unions active in Poland in the 1920s and 1930s published a monthly publication called Arbeiter Fragen (Worker's Issues; initially published under the title of Najste Arbeiter-Fragen - New Worker's Issues). Although most of the articles were in Yiddish, some were also printed in Polish and Latinized Yiddish. Its chief editor from 1930 to 1936 was Szmul Zygielbojm.

References

Jewish anti-Zionism in Poland
Defunct newspapers published in Poland
Yiddish periodicals
Bundism in Europe
Yiddish-language mass media in Poland